The 1982 Southwest Conference men's basketball tournament was held March 4–6 at Reunion Arena in Dallas, Texas. The first round took place March 1 at the higher seeded campus sites.

Number 1 seed Arkansas defeated 2 seed Houston 84–69 to win their 3rd championship and receive the conference's automatic bid to the 1982 NCAA tournament.

Format and seeding 
The tournament consisted of 9 teams in a single-elimination tournament. The 3 seed received a bye to the Quarterfinals and the 1 and 2 seed received a bye to the Semifinals.

Tournament

References 

1981–82 Southwest Conference men's basketball season
Basketball in the Dallas–Fort Worth metroplex
Southwest Conference men's basketball tournament